John Howden, O.P., D.D., was a pre-Reformation clergyman who served as the Bishop of Sodor and Man.

A Dominican friar, he was appointed the bishop of the Diocese of Sodor and Man by papal provision on 18 May or 19 June 1523. He is said to have vacated the see by 17 February 1530, however, a bishop "John" was mentioned in documents in July 1532 and 2 July 1533. The  next certain bishop of Sodor and Man was Thomas Stanley who was appointed to the see in 1542.

References 

 
 
 
 
 

16th-century English Roman Catholic bishops
Bishops of Sodor and Man
Dominican bishops
Year of birth unknown
Year of death unknown